Jean Comaroff (born 22 July 1946) is Professor of African and African American Studies and of Anthropology, Oppenheimer Fellow in African Studies at Harvard University. She is an expert on the effects of colonialism on people in Southern Africa. Until 2012, Jean was the Bernard E. & Ellen C. Sunny Distinguished Service Professor of Anthropology and of Social Sciences at the University of Chicago and Honorary Professor of Anthropology at the University of Cape Town.

She received her B.A. in 1966 from the University of Cape Town and her Ph.D. in 1974 from  London School of Economics. She has been a University faculty member since 1978.

In collaboration with her husband John Comaroff, as well as on her own, Comaroff has written extensively on colonialism, and hegemony based on fieldwork conducted in southern Africa and Great Britain.

A lawsuit was filed in February 2022 against Harvard University for a pattern of ignoring reports of sexual harassment against students by her husband John Comaroff, alleging that Jean Comaroff was an enabler of her husband's behavior.

Comaroff also serves as a member of the Editorial Collective of the journal Public Culture. An important recent book that she wrote with John Comaroff is Theory from the South, which among other things covers "how Euro-America is evolving towards Africa."

Personal life 
Jean Comaroff was born in Edinburgh, Scotland, shortly after World War II. Her father, a Jewish South African doctor, joined the British Army Medical Corps while studying abroad to specialize in obstetrics and gynecology. Her mother was a convert to Judaism, born to a Lutheran German family that had emigrated to South Africa in the late nineteenth century. Dr. Comaroff's parents returned to South Africa when she was ten months old, settling in the highly segregated industrial town of Port Elizabeth. While the family supported local political unrest, her father kept a low-profile due to his role running a local clinic. Her mother was involved in community work, including running soup kitchens and night-school, and working with the elderly Jewish community.

In late 1960s, she and her husband, anthropologist John Comaroff moved to Great Britain to pursue a PhD in anthropology. Both Jean and John Comaroff were faculty members at the University of Chicago between 1979 and 2012.

Publications 

 1985 Body of Power, Spirit of Resistance: The Culture and History of a South African People. Chicago: University of Chicago Press.
 2007  Beyond the Politics of Bare Life: AIDS and the Global Order. Public Culture, 19(1): 197–219.

Prizes 

Gordon Laing Prize, best book by a faculty member published by the University of Chicago Press [with John L. Comaroff]
Harry J. Kalven, Jr. Prize for advancement of research in law and society.
Anders Retzius Gold Medal from the Swedish Society for Anthropology and Geography.
 Best Special Issue award, Council of Editors of Learned Journals for “Millennial Capitalism and the Culture of Neoliberalism.” (Public Culture 12[2]).

Joint publications (with John Comaroff) 
 1991 Of Revelation and Revolution Vol I: Christianity, Colonialism, and Consciousness in South Africa. Chicago: University of Chicago Press.
 1992 Ethnography and the Historical Imagination. Boulder: Westview Press.
 1997 Of Revelation and Revolution Vol II: The Dialectics of Modernity on a South African Frontier. Chicago: University of Chicago Press.
 2000 Millennial Capitalism: First Thoughts on a Second Coming. Public Culture, 12(2): 291–343.
 2006 Law and Disorder in the Postcolony (eds.) University of Chicago Press.
 2006 The Portraits of an Ethnographer as a Young Man: The Photography of Isaac Schapera in "Old Botswana."  Anthropology Today. 22(1):10-17.
 2007 Picturing a Colonial Past: The African Photographs of Isaac Schapera. (eds. w/ D.A. James) University of Chicago Press.
 2009 Ethnicity, Inc. (Chicago Studies in Practices of Meaning), University of Chicago Press (July 15, 2009)
 2009 Dixit: Violencia y ley en la poscolonia: una reflexión sobre las complicidades Norte-Sur, Buenos Aires y Madrid, Katz Barpal Editores,  (En coedición con el Centro de Cultura Contemporánea de Barcelona)
 2011 "Twenty Years after Of Revelation and Revolution: An Interview with Jean Comaroff", Social Sciences and Missions (Leiden: Brill), vol.24(2-3), pp. 148–170
 2012 Theory from the South: Or, How Euro-America is Evolving Toward Africa (The Radical Imagination). [Paradigm Publishers].

References

External links 
 University of Chicago Faculty Bio
 Harvard University Faculty bio
  Author's page

University of Chicago faculty
South African Jews
South African anthropologists
South African women anthropologists
1947 births
Living people
South African academics
South African people of Lithuanian-Jewish descent
South African emigrants to the United States
University of Cape Town alumni
Harvard University faculty